1921 in radio details the internationally significant events in radio broadcasting for the year 1921.


Events
2 January – Dr E. J. Van Etten of Calvary Episcopal Church makes one of the first religious broadcast on the Pittsburgh station KDKA.
3 January – Station 9XM (now WHA), at the University of Wisconsin, Madison, transmits the first spoken weather forecast. The station had been broadcasting weather bulletins in Morse code since 1916.
18 February – Warren G. Harding becomes the first U.S. president-elect to be heard on radio when he speaks on KDKA.
4 March – The first Presidential inauguration is broadcast from Washington, D.C., by KDKA.
10 March – From Pittsburgh's Davis Theater KDKA makes the first broadcast in history of a live opera/theater performance.
11 April – The world's first ever sports broadcast is made on KDKA by Florent Gibson of the Pittsburgh Post newspaper. The commentary is of a fight between Johnny Ray and Johnny Dundee at Motor Square Garden in Pittsburgh.
2 July – From Jersey City, New Jersey, KDKA transmits the first ever broadcast of a world heavyweight boxing bout.
5 August – The first broadcast of a baseball game is on the air from KDKA as the Pittsburgh Pirates defeat the Philadelphia Phillies 8–5 at Forbes Field.
20 September – KDKA and the Pittsburgh Post create the first "news room" and "news department" in broadcast history.
25 September – The wireless telegraph station in Sofia makes the first public radio broadcast in Bulgaria: the retransmission of a concert from the German station at Nauen.
8 October – The first broadcast of American football is on the air via KDKA as the University of Pittsburgh defeats West Virginia University at Pittsburgh's Forbes Field.
17 November – The first radio broadcast in New Zealand is made by University of Otago physics professor Robert Jack.
26 November – First public radio broadcast in France, from the Compagnie générale de la télégraphie sans fil (CSF) Sainte-Assise transmitter.
27 November – U.S. bandleader Vincent Lopez and his group begin making a series of weekly 90-minute music broadcasts on Westinghouse-owned station WJZ in Newark, New Jersey (later WABC New York).
24 December – First public radio broadcast from the Eiffel Tower in Paris.

Debuts
 February – WQAM is launched in Miami, Florida by the W.W. Luce of the Electrical Equipment Company.
26 July – Experimental station 8ACS (later WHK) is launched in Cleveland, Ohio, by Warren C. Cox/Cox Mfg. Co.
19 September – The first commercially licensed radio broadcasting station in the United States, WBZ, is launched by the Westinghouse Electric Corporation in Springfield, Massachusetts.
1 October – WJZ is launched by Westinghouse in Newark, New Jersey.
11 November – KYW is launched by Westinghouse in Chicago.

Births
25 February – Patricia Ryan, English-born American child actress, continues performing on radio until her death (d. 1949)
21 March – Antony Hopkins, British composer, pianist, conductor and music broadcaster (d. 2014)
1 April – Steve Race, English pianist-composer and radio presenter (d. 2009)
23 May – Humphrey Lyttelton, English jazz trumpeter and radio presenter (d. 2008)
19 July – Harold Camping, American religious broadcaster (d. 2013)
21 September – Jimmy Young, English singer and broadcaster (d. 2016)
19 October – Bern Bennett, American radio and television announcer (d. 2014)
24 December – Jimmy Clitheroe, English comic entertainer (d. 1973)

References

List of firsts by KDKA-AM

See also 
List of oldest radio stations

 
Radio by year